Mark Pringle (died 30 August 2009) was an Australian national triathlon champion.

Pringle was knocked down in a hit and run incident in Abu Dhabi on 24 July 2009. He subsequently died from his injuries on 30 August 2009, aged 50.

References

1959 births
2009 deaths
Australian male triathletes
20th-century Australian people
21st-century Australian people